Epembe is a constituency in the Ohangwena Region of northern Namibia. It had 14,837 inhabitants in 2004 and 6,489 registered voters . The district centre is the settlement of Epembe. 

Villages in this constituency include Eenheni, Egongo, Ekuma, Etambo la Mushi Onamogani, Etsapa, Iikelo, Ohenghono-Ohamikoka, Ohamukulungudju, Onhinda, Okuuya, Othilku, Oondunda, Onamvula A, Onamungonzi, Omuhongo, Omalambo, Onanyati, Ombaba, Oshamono, Okahwandada, Oshiweda, Onaame, Omushuwa, Omufiya wa Amutenya wa Shiweda, Ohamwiimbi, Okakwena, Onhinda, Ohamatundu Omevataahekele, Okamwandi, Onangolo and Onamundidi. Many of them are only accessible via 4x4, have only weak cell phone network coverage, and access to clean water is not universally available. Health and education facilities are far away for many residents, with the nearest clinics at Epembe and Onangolo.

Politics
As is common in all constituencies of former Owamboland, Namibia's ruling SWAPO Party has dominated elections since independence. It won the 2015 regional election uncontested, as no opposition party fielded a candidate. The 2020 regional election was also won by the SWAPO candidate. Matheus Nanghama received 3,136 votes, far ahead of Immanuel Kashona of the Independent Patriots for Change (IPC), an opposition party formed in August 2020, who obtained 279 votes.

References 

Constituencies of Ohangwena Region
States and territories established in 1992
1992 establishments in Namibia